Nova Air was an airline based in Mexico City, Mexico. It operated passenger charter services to the Caribbean, Central America and South America out of Mexico City International Airport.

History
Nova Air started operations in 2005 and was owned by Administración Profesional Aeronáutica and Polar Airlines de México.
All flights were suspended on August 5, 2008 due to lack of payment of air navigation rights to the Government of Mexico. The airline later resumed operations under the name of Charters Nova Air.

Fleet
Upon closure, the Nova Air fleet consisted of the following aircraft:

2 Boeing 737-200

As of 23 October 2008 the average age of the Nova Air fleet was 25.2 years

External links
Official website (now defunct)

References

Defunct airlines of Mexico
Airlines established in 2005
Airlines disestablished in 2008
Mexican companies established in 2005
2008 disestablishments in Mexico